Don Martín García Óñez de Loyola (1549 in Azpeitia, Gipuzkoa – December 24, 1598 at Curalaba) was a Spanish Basque soldier and Royal Governor of the Captaincy General of Chile. Very likely Ignatius of Loyola, the founder of the Society of Jesus, was his uncle.

Early life
As a young man in 1568, he arrived in Peru at the side of the new viceroy Francisco de Toledo, Count of Oropesa, as captain of the guard. In 1572, during the military expedition against Túpac Amaru — the last descendant of the Incas resisting foreign domination — Óñez de Loyola led a brilliant action of an advance column which fell upon the camp of the Inca and captured him.

For this great feat, he gained the rank of corregidor in a number of Peruvian towns, entitling him to their goods and labor. He also married to Beatriz Clara Coya, daughter of Inca ruler Sayri Túpac and niece of Túpac Amaru.

With these recommendations, the king named him governor of the Río de la Plata and Paraguay in 1592. However, just before he assumed the position, Philip II designated him Royal Governor of Chile, as he was considered the officer most apt to finish the Arauco War.

Governor of Chile

Óñez de Loyola arrived in Chile on September 23, 1592. He was determined to pacify the Arauco. To further this end he immediately set out for Concepción at the head of 110 troops which he had met at the capital. However, he realized that with such scarce resources he would not be able to achieve his objective and he requested reinforcements from Peru.

However, the appearance of the British pirate Richard Hawkins alarmed the authorities in Peru and their reinforcements were recalled for the defense of Peru itself. Hawkins also attacked Chile during his campaigns, assaulting Valparaiso, for example where he captured a ship. Because of the limited capacity of his ship, he only took things he needed and let the captured sailors go free.

The governor did not receive the requested soldiers, but members of the Jesuit and Augustinian orders did arrive. The first would have great importance for later events in the colonization of Chile, until they were eventually expelled.

The governor decided that he could not wait any longer and in 1594 he began a campaign to the south with the small contingent that he had assembled. He founded a fort at Santa Cruz de Óñez in May 1594, near the confluence of the Bio-Bio and Laja Rivers in Catiray, where gold mines were located on the Rele River.  The fort was elevated to the rank of city in 1595 giving it the name of Santa Cruz de Coya.

Three years later a group of 140 reinforcements arrived, but they were not enough. The lack of reinforcements was not the fault of the viceroy — who offered generous inducements to join the army — but rather the name of Chile, which had become so stained by the interminable conflict that no one wanted to risk their lives going to such a hell.

Death

The governor was in La Imperial when news arrived that the Mapuches had renewed their attacks against Angol. In order to reinforce this point, he set out with 50 men on December 21, 1598. On the second day of the march they arrived at a place called Curallaba or Curalava (the broken rock), on the banks of the Lumaco River, where they rested without taking any precautions against attack. On the nights of the 23rd and 24th the natives approached the camp, and with shouts and the sounds of horns they attacked the Spanish.

Óñez de Loyola and a pair of soldiers at his side fought very valiantly, but finally succumbed to the spears of the natives. In the melee almost all the Spaniards died, save a cleric named Bartolomé Pérez, who was taken prisoner, and a soldier named Bernardo de Pereda, who received 23 wounds on his body and was left for dead but improbably survived.

The Mapuches then initiated a general uprising which destroyed all the cities in their homeland south of the Biobío River. They kept the head of Óñez de Loyola, giving it back years later to the governor Alonso García de Ramón.

See also
Arauco War
Mapuche people
Disaster of Curalaba
Destruction of Seven Cities

References

Sources

Royal Governors of Chile
Spanish city founders
People of the Arauco War
People killed in the Arauco War
Spanish generals
Spanish military personnel killed in action
People from Azpeitia
16th-century Spanish people
1549 births
1598 deaths